Jewell Patek (born July 12, 1971) is an American politician who served in the Missouri House of Representatives from the 7th district from 1997 to 2001.

References

1971 births
Living people
Republican Party members of the Missouri House of Representatives